The 2021 Metro Atlantic Athletic Conference women's basketball tournament is the postseason women's basketball tournament for the Metro Atlantic Athletic Conference for the 2020–21 NCAA Division I women's basketball season. The tournament is scheduled to be played from March 9–13, 2021, at the Jim Whelan Boardwalk Hall in Atlantic City, New Jersey for the second year in a row. Since the tournament was never actually completed the year prior, the defending champions are the Quinnipiac Bobcats.

Seeds
All of the MAAC, teams except for Canisius, participated in the tournament. Canisius cancelled their season after going 0-5, so they did not compete in the conference tournament. New procedures took effect for this season, as it was official that not all MAAC teams would reach the originally scheduled 20 conference game mark. Team seeding was based on overall conference regular season wins – not including any third games scheduled between teams in lieu of non-conference opponents. A tiebreaker system to seed teams with identical conference records was also used. The top six teams received byes to the quarterfinals.

Schedule

Bracket

* denotes number of overtimes

All-championship team

See also
 2021 MAAC men's basketball tournament

References

2020–21 Metro Atlantic Athletic Conference women's basketball season
MAAC women's basketball tournament
Women's sports in New Jersey
College basketball tournaments in New Jersey
Sports competitions in Atlantic City, New Jersey
2021 in sports in New Jersey
March 2021 sports events in the United States